Stanley Frank "Tiny" Hill  (9 April 1927 – 2 October 2019) was a New Zealand international rugby union player and selector. A lock and flanker, Hill represented Canterbury and Counties at a provincial level, and was a member of the New Zealand national side, the All Blacks, from 1955 to 1959. He played 19 matches for the All Blacks, two of which were as captain, including 11 internationals. After retiring as a player, Hill served as New Zealand Army and Canterbury selector, and as an All Black selector from 1981 to 1986.

In the 1996 New Year Honours, Hill was appointed a Member of the Order of the British Empire, for services to rugby. His sons Stan and John were both New Zealand basketball representatives.

Hill died in Rolleston on 2 October 2019.

References

1927 births
2019 deaths
Rugby union players from New Plymouth
New Zealand rugby union players
New Zealand international rugby union players
Canterbury rugby union players
Counties Manukau rugby union players
Rugby union locks
Rugby union flankers
New Zealand Army personnel
New Zealand sports executives and administrators
New Zealand Members of the Order of the British Empire